Sabrina Goleš was the defending champion but did not compete that year.

Petra Langrová won in the final 7–6(7–0), 6–2 against Sandra Wasserman.

Seeds
A champion seed is indicated in bold text while text in italics indicates the round in which that seed was eliminated.

  Julie Halard (second round)
  Sandra Wasserman (final)
  Linda Ferrando (first round)
  Laura Garrone (quarterfinals)
 n/a
  Nathalie Herreman (second round)
  Federica Bonsignori (second round)
  Alexia Dechaume (first round)

Draw

References
 1988 Open Clarins Draw

Clarins Open
1988 WTA Tour